The Collinwood school fire (also known as the Lake View School fire) was a major disaster that occurred at the Lake View School in Collinwood, Ohio, when a fire erupted on March 4, 1908, killing 172 students, two teachers and one rescuer. It is one of the deadliest school disasters in United States history.

Fire
The Lake View School was a fire trap; similarly designed buildings could be found throughout the nation. During the fire, the school's masonry exterior acted as a chimney, sucking flame upward as the wooden interior burned; open stairways and the absence of fire breaks enhanced the chimney effect. Lake View had only two exits, and fire quickly blocked the front door. Children rushed to the rear door, but in a vestibule narrowed by partitions, they stumbled and climbed on top of one another, forming a pile that completely blocked the exit. Though later accounts sometimes described children pinned against inward-swinging doors, Lake View's doors opened outward.

The vestibule, however, created an impassable bottleneck for the crowd trying to rush through it. Collinwood's small volunteer fire department and horse-drawn engines arrived too late and were ill-equipped to battle the inferno. In less than an hour, the three floors and the roof of the Lake View School collapsed into the basement, leaving only a hollowed-out brick ruin. Almost half of the children and two teachers in the building died.

Cause of the fire 
The origin of the fire remains uncertain, though explanations proliferated. Newspapers circulated many possibilities, sometimes blaming the building's janitor, Fritz Hirter, for inattentiveness and running the boiler too hot. Other times, girls smoking in a basement closet near flammable materials came under scrutiny.  A quickly completed coroner's inquest concluded that heating pipes running next to exposed wooden joists ignited the building. The coroner blamed the fire on "conditions" and held no one legally accountable for it. Many parents condemned the quickness of the inquest and objected to its refusal to hold the school board, the architects, Hirter, or anyone else responsible. J.H. Morgan, Ohio's Chief Inspector of Public Buildings, explained the problem this way in his annual report to the Governor and citizens: "The cause of the fire cannot be determined.  Many believe it originated from the heating system or boilers, but proof has been offered to the contrary."

A memorial plaque placed at the site by the state of Ohio in 2003 agrees that the fire was of "unknown origin."

Aftermath

The town of Collinwood paid for the burial of nineteen unidentifiable bodies in a shared grave at Cleveland's Lake View Cemetery. After crews tore down the ruins of the school, disputes about the use of the land quickly arose. In the interests of efficiency and economy, the school board had initially planned to build a new school on the site of the tragedy, but mourning parents objected, and some also filed lawsuits seeking to prevent this.

After more than a year of dispute, the state paid for the land where the Lake View School had stood, and the town turned it into a memorial garden. The new Collinwood Memorial School, built to the highest standards of fire resistance at the time, was constructed on an adjacent lot.

See also
 List of historic fires

References

Further reading
 Bellamy, John Stark II (1997). Maniac in the Bushes: More Tales of Cleveland Woe. Cleveland, OH: Gray & Company, Publishers. 
 Everett, Marshall. "Complete Story of the Collinwood School Disaster and How Such Horrors Can Be Prevented", Cleveland : N.G. Hamilton Pub. Co., 1908.
 Jablonski, Ray. "New State Marker Honors Lakeview Fire Victims." Sun News. May 22, 2003.
 Jablonski, Ray. "School could be razed for homes." Sun News. October 28, 1999.
 Jablonski, Ray. "Reaction to proposal is mixed." Sun News. October 28, 1999.
 Jablonski, Ray. "Tragic past leads to present lessons." Sun News. October 18, 2001.

External links
 
 The Collinwood Fire, 1908
 Encyclopedia of Cleveland entry: Collinwood School Fire
 Dead Ohio Collinwood School Fire
 Collinwood Fire Memorial Sculpture, Lakeview Cemetery
 Jablonski, Ray. "The neighborhood never forgets." Sun News. October 8, 1998.  Sun Newspaper'''s 90th anniversary coverage
 Dissell, Rachel. "Collinwood school fire: 100 years later, an angel still kneels over the children." Cleveland Plain Dealer. March 2, 2008. Updated October 17, 2011.  Cleveland Plain Dealer'''s 100th anniversary coverage
 New Memorial School built on the premises of Lakeview/ Old Memorial School.
 
 Ash Wednesday at Making Light
 In Loving Remembrance – A 24-page commemorative booklet produced in conjunction with an exhibit at Cleveland Public Library on the disaster.
 Collinwood School Fire: March 4, 1908 filmed by William Hubern Bullock

1900s in Cleveland
School fire disasters
Building and structure fires in the United States
1908 in Ohio
Fire disasters involving barricaded escape routes
Fires in Ohio
1908 fires in the United States
Collinwood
March 1908 events
Human stampedes in the United States
Building collapses in the United States
Building collapses caused by fire